Bazelon is a surname. Notable people with the surname include:

 Cecile Gray Bazelon (born 1927), painter
 David L. Bazelon (1909–1993), jurist
 Emily Bazelon (born 1971), journalist
 Irwin Bazelon (1922–1995), composer

See also
 Bazelon Center for Mental Health Law